Musgrave may refer to:

Places

Australia

Generally
Musgrave Block, a geological province in South Australia and Western Australia

Queensland
Musgrave, Queensland, a town in Queensland
Musgrave Telegraph Station, a former telegraph station in Queensland
Port Musgrave, a bay on the west coast of Cape York Peninsula in Queensland
Electoral district of Musgrave, a former electorate

Northern Territory and South Australia
Musgrave Ranges, a mountain range in the Northern Territory and South Australia

South Australia
County of Musgrave, a cadastral unit

England
 Musgrave, Cumbria, civil parish in Cumbria
 Great Musgrave, village in Cumbria
 Little Musgrave, village in Cumbria
 Musgrave railway station, station to the west of Great Musgrave in Cumbria

Canada
Musgrave Harbour, a town in the province of Newfoundland and Labrador.

New Zealand
 Mount Musgrave, South Island, New Zealand

Northern Ireland
 Musgrave, Belfast, ward of South Belfast

South Africa
 Musgrave, Durban, a suburb of Durban that is part of Berea

Organizations
 Musgrave Group, Irish food wholesaler and retailer
 Musgrave Rifles, South African rifle company
 John Musgrave & Sons, a manufacturer of stationary steam engines located in Lancashire, England

Other uses
 Musgrave (surname)
 Musgrave non-dead-centre engine, a stationary steam engine
 "The Adventure of the Musgrave Ritual", an 1893 Sherlock Holmes mystery by Arthur Conan Doyle
 "Matty Groves", a folk ballad sometimes called "Little Musgrave and Lady Barnard"

See also
Musgraves (disambiguation)
Musgrave Park (disambiguation)
 Musgrove (disambiguation)